Badnavirus is a genus of viruses, in the family Caulimoviridae order Ortervirales. Plants serve as natural hosts. There are 67 species in this genus. Diseases associated with this genus include: CSSV: leaf chlorosis, root necrosis, red vein banding in young leaves, small mottled pods, and stem/root swelling followed by die-back. Infection decreases yield by 25% within one year, 50% within two years and usually kills trees within 3–4 years.

Taxonomy
The following species are recognized:

Aglaonema bacilliform virus
Banana streak GF virus
Banana streak IM virus
Banana streak MY virus
Banana streak OL virus
Banana streak UA virus
Banana streak UI virus
Banana streak UL virus
Banana streak UM virus
Banana streak VN virus
Birch leafroll-associated virus
Blackberry virus F
Bougainvillea chlorotic vein banding virus
Cacao bacilliform Sri Lanka virus
Cacao mild mosaic virus
Cacao swollen shoot virus
Cacao swollen shoot CD virus
Cacao swollen shoot CE virus
Cacao swollen shoot Ghana M virus
Cacao swollen shoot Ghana N virus
Cacao swollen shoot Ghana Q virus
Cacao swollen shoot Togo A virus
Cacao swollen shoot Togo B virus
Cacao yellow vein banding virus
Camellia lemon glow virus
Canna yellow mottle associated virus
Canna yellow mottle virus
Citrus yellow mosaic virus
Codonopsis vein clearing virus
Commelina yellow mottle virus
Cycad leaf necrosis virus
Dioscorea bacilliform AL virus
Dioscorea bacilliform AL virus 2
Dioscorea bacilliform RT virus 1
Dioscorea bacilliform RT virus 2
Dioscorea bacilliform RT virus 3
Dioscorea bacilliform SN virus
Dioscorea bacilliform TR virus
Dracaena mottle virus
Epiphyllum mottle-associated virus
Fig badnavirus 1
Gooseberry vein banding associated virus
Grapevine badnavirus 1
Grapevine Roditis leaf discoloration-associated virus
Grapevine vein clearing virus
Green Sichuan pepper vein clearing-associated virus
Ivy ringspot-associated virus
Jujube mosaic-associated virus
Kalanchoe top-spotting virus
Mulberry badnavirus 1
Pagoda yellow mosaic associated virus
Pineapple bacilliform CO virus
Pineapple bacilliform ER virus
Piper yellow mottle virus
Polyscias mosaic virus
Rubus yellow net virus
Schefflera ringspot virus
Spiraea yellow leafspot virus
Sugarcane bacilliform Guadeloupe A virus
Sugarcane bacilliform Guadeloupe D virus
Sugarcane bacilliform IM virus
Sugarcane bacilliform MO virus
Sweet potato pakakuy virus
Taro bacilliform CH virus
Taro bacilliform virus
Wisteria badnavirus 1
Yacon necrotic mottle virus

Structure
Viruses in Badnavirus are non-enveloped, with bacilliform geometries. These viruses are about 30 nm wide and 90-900 nm long. Genomes are circular and non-segmented.

Life cycle
Viral replication is nuclear/cytoplasmic. Entry into the host cell is achieved by attachment of the viral proteins to host receptors, which mediates endocytosis. Replication follows the dsDNA(RT) replication model. DNA-templated transcription, specifically dsDNA-RT transcription is the method of transcription. The virus exits the host cell by nuclear pore export, and tubule-guided viral movement. Plants serve as the natural host. The virus is transmitted via a vector (cssv:  mealybugs). Transmission routes are vector, mechanical, and seed borne.

References

External links
 Viralzone: Badnavirus
 Genus: Badnavirus - Caulimoviridae - Reverse Transcribing DNA and RNA Viruses - International Committee on Taxonomy of Viruses (ICTV)

Caulimoviridae
Virus genera